Beginning of Things is the second album from American country music singer Charlie Worsham. It was released on April 21, 2017 via Warner Bros. Records Nashville.

Critical reception
Stephen Thomas Erlewine of AllMusic rated the album 4 out of 5 stars, praising Worsham's "way with a joke" and "keen eye for detail and storytelling". Matt Bjorke of Roughstock was favorable, praising the varied song styles and lyrics.

Track listing

References 

2017 albums
Charlie Worsham albums
Warner Records albums
Albums produced by Frank Liddell